FH Münster, based in the Westphalian city of Münster with a second campus in Steinfurt, is a German university. It has a student enrolment of around 15,000 (as of winter semester 2018/19), making it one of the largest public universities of applied sciences in Germany. It has twelve faculties and one central scientific unit.

The University offers around 100 degree programmes (as of winter semester 2018/19) in the fields of business and management, engineering, design, health, social studies and teacher training. In November 2011, Münster University of Applied Sciences was the first university of applied sciences in Germany to successfully complete the process of system accreditation. Since then, the University has been able to accredit its degree programmes itself – without the need for assessment by external agencies.

History/foundation 
FH Münster was founded in 1971. It was established as a result of an amalgamation of state and private construction and engineering colleges.

Faculties and central scientific unit 
FH Münster is divided into twelve faculties, seven of which are in Münster, the other five in Steinfurt. The largest faculties are the Münster School of Business and the Faculty of Social Work.

 Münster School of Architecture
 Civil Engineering
 Chemical Engineering
 Münster School of Design
 Electrical Engineering and Computer Science
 Energy • Building Services • Environmental Engineering
 Mechanical Engineering
 Food • Nutrition • Facilities
 Münster School of Health
 Engineering Physics
 Social Work
 Münster School of Business

There is also one Central Scientific Unit, the Münster Center For Interdisciplinarity. There students can train to become vocational school teachers or industrial engineers in one of its institutes:

 Münster School of Vocational Education (IBL)
 Institute of Business Administration and Engineering (ITB)

Degree programmes 
The Bachelor and Master’s programmes offered by the university are spread across the areas of business and management, engineering, design, health, social work and teacher training. Dual and executive degree programmes are also offered at the University, as well as international degree programmes.

Münster was one of the first universities of applied sciences to establish a doctoral programme. Outstanding students have to option to realise their PhD project in cooperation with universities at home or abroad.

Münster University of Applied Sciences fully met the requirements of the Bologna Process, namely of creating harmonised academic qualifications across Europe, and completely converted its study programme to the tiered Bachelor/Master’s system by winter semester 2007/2008.

Research 
In recent years, Münster University of Applied Sciences has been one of the universities of applied sciences with the most third-party funding in Germany. The numerous research endeavours are increasingly being flanked by collaborative PhDs.

Institutes 

The Institute network "Resources, Energy, Infrastructure" consists of:

 Institute of Water • Resources • Environment (IWARU)
 Institute of Energy and Process Technology (IEP)
 Institute for underground construction (IuB)

Further internal institutes

 Institute for Society and Digital Studies (GUD)
 Interdisciplinarity in Health – Technology – Ability to Work (IGTA)
 Institute of Construction and Functional Material  (IKFM)
 Institute of Sustainable Nutrition and Food Production (iSuN)
 Institute of Optical Technologies (IOT)
 Institute for Process Management and Digital Transformation (IPD)

International cooperative agreements and contacts 
FH Münster currently has around 195 active international university contacts (as of summer semester 2014), some 120 of which are via the European exchange programme, ERASMUS.

FH Münster is a member of the higher education consortium UAS7, an alliance of seven research-oriented universities of applied sciences with an international outlook. The shared objective is to foster cooperation with higher education institutions in North and South America.

Locations

Münster 

The following facilities are located in Münster: the faculties of Architecture, Civil Engineering, Design, Food · Nutrition · Facilities, Health, Social Work, Business Administration and the Münster School of Vocational Education (IBL).

Steinfurt 

Steinfurt is home to the faculties of Chemical Engineering, Electrical Engineering and Computer Science, Mechanical Engineering, Energy · Buildings Services· Environmental Engineering, Engineering Physics and the Institute of Business Management in Technology (ITB). Over 3,000 students are enrolled on degree programmes at the faculties in Steinfurt.

References

External links 
 Fachhochschule Münster (English)

Universities of Applied Sciences in Germany
Münster
Universities and colleges in North Rhine-Westphalia
1971 establishments in West Germany
Educational institutions established in 1971